The 2004 World Modern Pentathlon Championship held in Moscow, Russia from May 29 to June 1.

Medal summary

Men's events

Women's events

Medal table

See also
 World Modern Pentathlon Championship

References

 Sport123

Modern pentathlon in Europe
World Modern Pentathlon Championships, 2004
World Modern Pentathlon Championships, 2004
Sports competitions in Moscow
Modern pentathlon competitions in Russia